Merrion Frances Fox AM (born 5 March 1946) is an Australian writer of children's books and an educationalist specialising in literacy. Fox has been semi-retired since 1996, but she still gives seminars and lives in Adelaide, South Australia.

Early life and education
Merrion Frances Partridge was born in Melbourne on 5 March 1946 to Nancy and Wilfrid Gordon McDonald Partridge. In October, her parents left Australia to become teaching missionaries of Hope Fountain Mission in Rhodesia, and Partridge and her two sisters grew up and were educated in Africa. She was the only white child at the mission school. After authorities found out, she was forced to go to an all-white school and was teased for having an African accent. After graduating high school, she did volunteer work in a conference centre of the World Council of Churches near Geneva, Switzerland.

Partridge dreamed of pursuing a stage career. Her father reluctantly agreed to send her to an English drama school on the condition that she would attend Rose Bruford College in London, which also included a compulsory teaching degree. In 1965, she began three years at drama school and discovered that "she didn't really want to act, but she did want to be known." She also met fellow student Malcolm Fox. After marrying in 1969, they moved to Rwanda, then England and finally Adelaide, South Australia. Their daughter Chloe was born in 1971.

Career
In Adelaide, Fox applied for a radio job at ABC. She only had irregular parts in radio plays, and began teaching as she did not get paid enough money. By 1973, Fox had signed up to teach drama full-time at Sturt's Teachers University.

Possum Magic 

When her daughter was seven, Fox decided to take a course in children's literature at Flinders University because of Chloe's love of reading. One of the assignments was to write a children's book, for which Fox wrote a story named Hush the Invisible Mouse. Her professor encouraged her to publish it, and it was illustrated by Julie Vivas, a student in the art department. It was rejected nine times over five years before Omnibus Books accepted it, but asked her to rewrite it more lyrically, cut two-thirds of the story and change the mice to possums.

In 1983, the book was published as Possum Magic. It follows Hush, a possum whose Grandma Poss turns him invisible to protect him from the bush. Now considered a classic in Australian children's literature, Possum Magic is Australia's bestselling children's book.

Literary career 
In 1984, Fox's second book Wilfrid Gordon McDonald Partridge was published by Omnibus Books. It follows a boy who helps his elderly neighbor recover her lost memory through gifts. The title of the book was the name of her father.

The book Guess What? ranks number 66 on the American list of the 100 most-challenged books 1990 to 2000. Groups and agencies can challenge a book to prevent it from being available to be read by the general public.

Teaching career 
In 1981, while working in drama, Fox decided to retrain in literacy studies. She said: "Literacy has become the great focus of my life – it's my passion, my battle and my mission and my exhaustion". She has published books on literacy aimed at children, their parents, teachers and educators. She held the position of Associate Professor, Literacy Studies, in the School of Education at Flinders University until her retirement in 1996. Since her retirement from teaching, Fox travels around the world visiting many countries and doing presentations and speaking on children's books and literacy issues. Following an interrogation by US immigration officials on a trip in February 2017 to deliver a keynote speech in Milwaukee, Fox said that she would probably never visit the US again.

Personal life
Fox is married to teacher Malcolm Fox. Her daughter, Chloë Fox, is a former member of the South Australian House of Assembly. As she dislikes her given, legal name, Fox began using her nickname "Mem" around thirteen years of age.

Awards and recognition
 Won – New South Wales Premier's Literary Awards Ethel Turner Prize for young people's literature for Possum Magic (1984)
 Won – Dromkeen Medal (1990)
 Won – Member of the Order of Australia for "services to children's literature" (1993)
 Won – COOL Award for Possum Magic (1994)
 Won – Centenary Medal (2001)
 Honorary doctorates – Wollongong and Flinders Universities, Australia in 1996 and 2004.

Works

Children's books
 Possum Magic (1983), illustrated by Julie Vivas
 Wilfrid Gordon McDonald Partridge (1984), illustrated by Julie Vivas
 A Cat called Kite (1985), illustrated by K. Hawley
 Zoo-Looking (1986), illustrated by Rodney McRae
 Arabella, the Smallest Girl in the World (1986), illustrated by Vicky Kitanov
 Hattie and the Fox (1986), illustrated by Patricia Mullins
 Just Like That (1986) with Kilmeny Niland
 Sail Away: The Ballad of Skip and Nell (1986), illustrated by Pamela Lofts
 The Straight Line Wonder (1987), illustrated by Meredith Thomas
 A Bedtime Story (1987), illustrated by Sisca Verwoert
 Goodnight Sleep Tight (1988), illustrated by Helen Semmler
 Guess What? (1988) with Vivienne Goodman
 Koala Lou (1988), illustrated by Pamela Lofts
 With Love at Christmas (1988), illustrated by Fay Plamka
 Night Noises (1989), illustrated by Terry Denton
 Feathers and Fools (1989), illustrated by Lorraine Ellis
 Shoes from Grandpa (1989), illustrated by Patricia Mullins
 Sophie (1989), illustrated by Craig Smith
 Time for Bed (1993), illustrated by Jane Dyer
 Tough Boris (1994), illustrated by Kathryn Brown
 Wombat Divine (1995), illustrated by Kerry Argent
 A Bedtime Story (1996), illustrated by Elivia Savadier
 Boo to a Goose (1996), illustrated by David Miller
 Whoever You Are (1997), illustrated by Leslie Staub
 Sleepy Bears (1999), illustrated by Kerry Argent
 Harriet, You'll Drive Me Wild! (2000), illustrated by Marla Frazee
 The Magic Hat (2002), illustrated by Tricia Tusa
 Where Is the Green Sheep? (2004), illustrated by Judy Horacek
 Hunwick's Egg (2005), illustrated by Pamela Lofts
 A Particular Cow (2006), illustrated by Terry Denton
 Where the Giant Sleeps (2007), pictures by Vladimir Radunsky
 Ten Little Fingers and Ten Little Toes (2008), illustrated by Helen Oxenbury
 The Goblin and the Empty Chair (2009), illustrated by Leo and Diane Dillon
 Hello, Baby! (2009), illustrated by Steve Jenkins 
 A Giraffe in the Bath (March 2010) with Olivia Rawson, illustrated by Kerry Argent 
 Let's Count Goats! (October 2010), illustrated by Jan Thomas 
 The Little Dragon (April 2011), illustrated by Roland Harvey
 Two Little Monkeys (May 2012), illustrated by Jill Barton
 Tell Me About Your Day Today (2012), illustrated by Lauren Stringer 
 Good Night, Sleep Tight (2012), illustrated by Judy Horacek
 Yoo-hoo, Ladybird! (2013), illustrated by Laura Ljungkvist
 Baby Bedtime (2013), illustrated by Emma Quay
 Nellie Belle (2015), illustrated by Mike Austin
 This & That (2015), illustrated by Judy Horacek
 Ducks Away! (2016), illustrated by Judy Horacek
 I'm Australian Too (2017), illustrated by Ronojoy Ghosh
 Bonnie and Ben Rhyme Again (October 2018), illustrated by Judy Horacek
 The Tiny Star (2019), illustrated by Freya Blackwood

Non-fiction
 Thereby Hangs a Tale (1980)
 How to Teach Drama to Infants Without Really Crying (Australian title) (1984) (Teaching Drama to Young Children (USA title) (1987))
 Mem's the Word (1990 – Australian title) (Dear Mem Fox (1992 – USA title)
 English Essentials: The Wouldn't-Be-Without-It Guide To Writing Well (1993 and 2009) with Lyn Wilkinson
 Memories: An Autobiography (1992)
 Radical Reflections: Passionate Opinions on Teaching, Learning, and Living (1993)
 Reading Magic: How Your Child Can Learn to Read Before School - and Other Read-aloud Miracles (2001)

References

Sources

External links
 
 
 Mem Fox, Australian Author of Children's Books (Biography)
 Children's and Youth Library (Library pages on Mem Fox)
 Interview about her name – transcript and audio, 2009
 Finding Aid to Mem Fox's papers held at Lu Rees Archives
 

1946 births
Living people
Australian children's writers
Australian memoirists
Writers from Adelaide
Members of the Order of Australia
Recipients of the Centenary Medal
Australian women memoirists
Australian women children's writers